The Turkey national rugby union team is a relatively recent creation, being started at the end of 2009. Turkey is currently a third-tier side. The team first played in 2012 against Slovakia and won 31–5 in Bratislava. On tour, they also defeated Estonia 49–5 in Tallinn. Turkey has yet to play in the qualifying stages for the Rugby World Cup finals.

Rugby union in Turkey is administered by the Turkish Rugby Federation (Türkiye Ragbi Federasyonu). The federation is affiliated to Rugby Europe (formerly FIRA-AER), but not yet to the World Rugby (formerly IRB). Murat Pazan is the federation's president.

Competitive record

Sevens
 2012 European Nations Cup Division 3
 2013 European Sevens Division B South
 2014 European Sevens Division B South
 2015 Rugby Europe Sevens – Lower Divisions
 2016 Rugby Europe Sevens Conferences
 2017 Rugby Europe Sevens Conferences
 2018 Rugby Europe Sevens Conferences
 2019 Rugby Europe Sevens Conference
 2021 Rugby Europe Sevens Trophy

Union
 2012–2014 European Nations Cup Third Division
 2014–2016 European Nations Cup Second Division
 2016–17 Rugby Europe Conference
 2017–18 Rugby Europe International Championships
 2018–19 Rugby Europe International Championships
 2019–20 Rugby Europe International Championships
 2021–22 Rugby Europe International Championships

Current squad (XV)

Guven Tasoglu (Based in England)
Abdullah Gunes (ODTÜ SK)
Dinçhan Kilercioğlu (ODTÜ SK)
Kemal Ege Gurkan (ODTÜ SK)
Ertugrul Gunday (ODTÜ SK)
Doğu Eroğlu (ODTÜ SK)
Koray Kaya (Samsun RK)
Adem Selim (Samsun RK)
Selçuk Kozlu (Samsun RK)
Yavuz Kocaer (Samsun RK)
Mustafa Kemal Kurt (Koç Üniversitesi SK)
Mehmet Akif Ersoy (Trakya Üniversites Ragbi)
Deniz Krom (Kadıköy RK)
Mert Zabci (Based in England)
Murat Altun (Based in France)
Semih Aydın (Based in France)
Bahri Dagli (Based in France)
Huseyin Sasmaz (Based in France)
Ramazan Kilickaya (RC Vichy)
Gokhan Ceylan (Based in France)
Atilla Demir (Based in France)
Necmi Kara (Based in France)
Hüseyin Yesik (Based in France)  
Melikşah Kuzucu (Based in France)
Kerim Galal (Based in Germany)
Erkut Levent Durmus (Based in Germany)
Ali Bökeyhan Sürer (Based in Germany)    
Tamer Celikbas James (Based in Wales)
Cenk Tekin Akdeniz (Based in Scotland)
Tarik Tin (Based in England)
Arin Gulsen (Based in Wales)

Record

Overall

See also
Rugby union in Turkey

References

External links
 Stephane Vincent is the top scorer of Turkey
 Turkish Rugby Union News, Teams and Match Results
 Şahin Kömürcü
 Turkish Rugby Federation
 Results

European national rugby union teams
Rugby union in Turkey
Rugby union
Teams in European Nations Cup (rugby union)